Heliophanus ibericus is a jumping spider species in the genus Heliophanus.  It was first described by Wanda Wesołowska in 1986 and lives in Spain.

References

Spiders described in 1986
Fauna of Spain
Spiders of Europe
Salticidae
Taxa named by Wanda Wesołowska